Banwol-dong is a neighborhood of Sangnok-gu, Ansan, Gyeonggi Province, South Korea.

External links
 Banwol-dong

References

Sangnok-gu
Neighbourhoods in Ansan